Martin Kližan was the defending champion, but withdrew before the tournament began.

Leonardo Mayer won the title, defeating Florian Mayer in the final, 6–4, 4–6, 6–3.

Seeds

Draw

Finals

Top half

Bottom half

Qualifying

Seeds

Qualifiers

Lucky losers

Qualifying draw

First qualifier

Second qualifier

Third qualifier

Fourth qualifier

References
Main Draw
Qualifying Draw

Singles